The 2005 totesport League season was a 45 over English county cricket competition; colloquially known as the Sunday League. Essex Eagles won the League for the fourth time.

Final standings

Division One

Season Progression 
A detailed description of the season progression can be found here Division One Progression

Division two

Season Progression 
A detailed description of the season progression can be found here Division Two Progression

References 

Pro40